La Poupée ("The Doll") is a 1962 French-Italian science fiction film directed by Jacques Baratier. It was entered into the 12th Berlin International Film Festival.  It was Baratier's final film.  La Poupée is a surrealistic work, "part theater of the absurd, part musical with Greek chorus".  Grand Guignol

In La Poupée, a rebel impersonates the leader of a fictional country, loosely modeled off Latin American dictators.  His "wife" Marion (played by the crossdressing actor Sonne Teal) is in fact also a robot imposter, the Poupée.

Cast
 Zbigniew Cybulski - Col. Prado Roth / The Rebel
 Sonne Teal - Marion / La Poupée
 Claudio Gora - Moren, the Banker
 Catherine Milinaire - Mirt
 Jean Aron - Prof. Palmas
 Sacha Pitoëff - Sayas
 Daniel Emilfork - Gant de Crin
 Jacques Dufilho - The Indian
 Gabriel Jabbour - Joachim
 Michel de Ré - Gervasio
 László Szabó - Pascuel
 Roger Karl - Terremoche
 Jean Galland - Gonziano
 Max Montavon - Scientist

References

External links

1962 films
1960s science fiction films
1960s French-language films
French science fiction films
Italian science fiction films
Films directed by Jacques Baratier
1960s French films
1960s Italian films